The Corydon Brown House is a house in Dakota City, Iowa, United States. It was listed on the National Register of Historic Places on November 14, 1978. Corydon Brown, the former owner of the house, was a miller, and the house was a social hub for many years.

Early Days of the House
Corydon Brown, a member of a well-to-do family in Syracuse, New York, decided to move to Dakota City, Iowa in the 1860s. Brown's wife did not want to leave the comforts of the city for the hard prairie living that was guaranteed in Iowa. Brown, without his wife, took a train to Dubuque, Iowa, a stagecoach to Fort Dodge, Iowa, and followed a Native American horse trail north to Dakota City. When Brown reached Dakota City, he found men living in log cabins and caves near the Des Moines River. Brown's wife said she would move to Iowa only when she could move into a house of comparable quality, and after eleven years, she followed her husband to the prairie.

The Browns move on
Corydon and his wife lived in the house for eleven years until following one of their five children to Des Moines, Iowa. As tradition dictated, the eldest son took over the property. However, he did not want to live on a farm, so the property was passed to the second-eldest son. The property was sold to another family, and was later converted to apartments. A buyer purchased the farmland and apartments, but did not use the house. The formerly stately home was used as a dumping ground by neighbors.

Donation
The grounds were donated to the Humboldt County Historical Association. It was renovated, and many other historical buildings have been moved to the site, now named the Humboldt County Mill Farm Historical Museum.

Architecture
The Corydon Brown House is vernacular form of Italianate residential architecture.  The two-story brick structure measures .  The bricks for the house were manufactured on site.  The house features a bracketed cornice on the front and side elevations, and brick quoining on the corners, and two porches with flat roofs and narrow wooden posts.

See also
Humboldt County, Iowa
National Register of Historic Places listings in Iowa

References

External links
 Humboldt County Mill Farm Historical Museum - Humboldt County Historical Association

Houses completed in 1878
Houses on the National Register of Historic Places in Iowa
Museums in Humboldt County, Iowa
Open-air museums in Iowa
Houses in Humboldt County, Iowa
National Register of Historic Places in Humboldt County, Iowa